Patrick Burgener (born 1 June 1994), better known as Pat Burgener, is a Swiss professional snowboarder, two-time Olympian and musician. Pat joined the Swiss national team at the age of 14 and landed the world’s first Switch Backside Triple Cork 1440 in April 2011. Pat competed for Switzerland in the men's halfpipe at the 2018 Olympic Winter Games in PyeongChang where he finished 5th overall. He earned two bronze medals in the halfpipe events at the FIS Freestyle Ski and Snowboarding World Championships 2017 and again in 2019. Pat was named to his second Swiss Olympic Snowboard Freestyle Team on 18 January 2022. He represented Switzerland in the men’s halfpipe at the 2022 Olympic Winter Games in Beijing where he qualified for the finals and placed 11th overall. His career results also include nine World Cup podiums, five European Cup podiums and seven Swiss Champion titles respectively in halfpipe and early on in big air. 

In addition to professional snowboarding, Pat has been pursuing a parallel career in music since 2014. The singer-songwriter has released four EPs so far: The Route (2018), Icar (2019), Better Man (2020) and California Sun (2021). With over 4.4 million streams on Spotify, the song "Staring At The Sun" from the 2019 EP Icar remains Pat’s most listened-to track to date. His song "Allons Danser" ("How About A Dance") was commissioned as the 2020 Swiss Press Song for the 2020 Swiss Press Award. Pat was named the SRF 3 Best Talent for August 2021, an award through which the Swiss Radio and Television honours up-and-coming music acts from Switzerland. His latest single "Work It Out" came out shortly before he competed in the 2022 Winter Olympics. Pat has performed solo or with his band at various festivals and venues across Switzerland, including the Montreux Jazz Festival, Zermatt Unplugged, Sion sous les étoiles, Gurtenfestival, Caribana Festival, Kaufleuten and others. He has also performed in New York City and has been featured in Swiss Live Talents Showcases at Mondo.NYC, New York’s Annual Music, Arts & Technology Conference & Showcase Festival. Pat's mother tongue is French, and he also speaks English and Swiss German fluently.

Sports career

Snowboarding achievements 
Below is a selection of Pat's major career highlights.

 2009 Burton European Junior Open, Halfpipe, Laax, Switzerland – 1st
 2009 Burton European Junior Open, Slopestyle, Laax, Switzerland – 1st
 2010 FIS World Cup, Halfpipe, Kreischberg, Austria – 2nd
 2010 FIS World Cup, Halfpipe, Valmalenco, Italy – 3rd
 2010/11 Swiss Champion | Halfpipe, Zermatt, Switzerland
 2010 FIS World Cup, Big Air, Stockholm, Sweden – 3rd
 2011 FIS Snowboard World Championships, Halfpipe, La Molina, Spain – 6th
 2011 Billabong Air & Style Rookie, Big Air, Innsbruck, Austria – 2nd
 2011 Burn River Jump Slopestyle, Livigno, Italy – 2nd
 2011 FIS World Cup Halfpipe Arosa, Italy – 3rd
 2011 first man in the world to land the Switch Backside Triple Cork 1440
 2011/12 Swiss Champion | Free-Style (1st in Big Air + 2nd in Halfpipe), Zermatt, Switzerland
 2011 Monster Energy Fridge Festival, Big Air, Budapest, Hungary – 1st
 2012 Billabong Air & Style Innsbruck, Big Air, Austria – 5th
 2012/13 Swiss Champion | Big Air, Zermatt, Switzerland
 2012 freestyle.ch, Big Air, Zurich, Switzerland – 3rd
 2012 FIS World Cup, Big Air, Antwerp, Belgium – 3rd
 2015 Russian Grand Prix, Big Air, Moscow, Russia – 4th
 2015 Swiss Champion | Halfpipe, Corvatsch, Switzerland
 2015 FIS European Cup, Halfpipe, Corvatsch, Switzerland – 1st
 2015 U.S. Revolution Tour, Halfpipe, Copper Mountain, USA – 2nd
 2016 LAAX OPEN, Halfpipe, Laax, Switzerland – 2nd
 2016 U.S. Grand Prix, FIS World Cup, Park City, USA – 4th
 2016 U.S. Revolution Tour, Halfpipe, Copper Mountain, USA – 2nd
 2016 Toyota U.S. Grand Prix, FIS World Cup, Halfpipe, Copper Mountain, USA – 1st
 2017 FIS Snowboard World Championships, Halfpipe, Sierra Nevada, Spain – 3rd 
 2017 Swiss Champion | Halfpipe, Laax, Switzerland 
 2017 FIS European Cup, Freestyle Champs, Halfpipe, Laax, Switzerland – 1st
 2017 Winter Games NZ, FIS World Cup, Halfpipe, Cardrona, New Zealand – 3rd
 2018 Olympic Winter Games, Halfpipe, PyeongChang, Republic of Korea – 5th 
 2018 Toyota U.S. Grand Prix, FIS World Cup, Halfpipe, Copper Mountain, USA – 4th
 2018 Winter Dew Tour, Halfpipe, Breckenridge, USA – 4th
 2019 FIS Snowboard World Championships, Halfpipe, Park City, USA – 3rd 
 2019 at Toyota U.S. Grand Prix, FIS World Cup, Halfpipe, Mammoth Mountain, USA – 2nd
 2019 Swiss Champion | Halfpipe, Laax, Switzerland
 2019 FIS European Cup, Freestyle Champs, Halfpipe, Laax, Switzerland – 2nd
 2019 FIS World Cup, Halfpipe, Secret Garden, China – 5th
 2020 Winter Dew Tour, Halfpipe, Copper Mountain, USA – 3rd
 2020 Snow Rodeo, FIS World Cup, Halfpipe, Calgary, Canada – 3rd
 2021 FIS European Cup, Halfpipe, Crans-Montana, Switzerland – 3rd
 2022 LAAX OPEN, FIS World Cup, Halfpipe, Laax, Switzerland – 6th
 2022 Olympic Winter Games, Halfpipe, Beijing, China – 11th
 2022 Swiss Champion | Halfpipe, Laax, Switzerland
 2022 FIS European Cup Premium, Halfpipe, Laax, Switzerland – 2nd

Music career

Extended plays

Selected singles

"Work It Out" 
Pat's first single of 2022, "Work It Out", was released on 28 January 2022, one week before the start of the 2022 Winter Olympics in Beijing, where he was set to compete in the men's halfpipe. "I really wanted to release the song now because it's part of my Olympic story," as Pat explained, and to draw on it as a source of motivation and positive energy before the competition. He wrote this song with his brother Max in the difficult period following his serious knee injury in a snowboarding accident in spring 2021. The song's message is that difficult situations – whether in relationships or in daily life – can be overcome with a positive attitude and a smile. "Work It Out" was featured on Swiss German-language Radio SRF 3 as the song of the day on 3 February 2022. "Work It Out" is the first song of Pat's forthcoming first album to be released in the latter part of 2022. Pat also directed and edited the official music video that was filmed by John Osterman on a Malibu beach in California. In April 2022, Pat released an acoustic version of this song and a new YouTube video, this time recorded and filmed in Lausanne, Switzerland.

"Low" 
“Low” is the second single of Pat’s forthcoming debut album. He co-wrote the song with his brother Max Burgener and released it on 13 May 2022. The single was produced by Tom Fuller. This is not their first collaboration – Tom Fuller also produced Pat’s fourth EP California Sun (2021), and the single “Work It Out”, Pat’s personal anthem for his 2022 Olympic snowboard odyssey. Pat shot the official music video accompanying the release of "Low" during the 2022 Winter Olympics in China, where he competed for Switzerland in the men’s snowboard halfpipe. The music video is titled "Low: A Journey at the Beijing Olympic Games", and Pat directed and edited it by himself. Taking the viewers behind the scenes of Pat's Olympics experience at Beijing 2022, the video includes footage from his arrival at Beijing airport, the Olympic Village, and Olympic competition sites, as well as an excerpt from the RTS Swiss TV programme “Au coeur des Jeux” which featured him on 7 February 2022, in an episode called “JO, Made in China: Pat Burgener”.

References

External links
  
 
 
 
 
Patrick Burgener at 2022 Winter Olympics
Pat Burgener at the Swiss Ski Federation
Pat Burgener on YouTube
Pat Burgener on Spotify
Pat Burgener on Genius
Pat Burgener on Songkick
Pat Burgener on the Swiss music platform Mx3.ch

1994 births
Living people
Swiss male snowboarders
Olympic snowboarders of Switzerland
Snowboarders at the 2018 Winter Olympics
Snowboarders at the 2022 Winter Olympics
21st-century Swiss people